Charybdis is a sea monster in Greek mythology.

Charybdis may also refer to:

Charybdis (crab), a genus of crabs 
Charybdis (comics), a fictional character in DC Comics
388 Charybdis, a main belt asteroid
Charybdis Glacier, Antarctica
Charybdis Icefalls, Antarctica
, several ships of the Royal Navy
Golden Charybdis Award at Taormina International Film Festival
Karybdis (band), a London-based metal band